Glup! was a Chilean rock-pop band active in the period 1996–2003. In 1999 the band performed at the Viña del Mar International Song Festival, coming soon afterwards into mainstream popularity in Chile due to their adolescent lyrics and sticky melodies. Freebola, released in 1999, was the group's commercial breakthrough hit. Although the main genre of band was pop rock it drew heavy inspiration from britpop.

Chilean rock music groups